Medenine is the major town in south-eastern Tunisia,  south of the port of Gabès and the Island of Djerba, on the main route to Libya. It is the capital of Medenine Governorate.

Overview 

In pre-colonial times, Medenine was already the most important trading centre in the south, attracting merchants from all over North Africa and even from Bornu, to the south of the Sahara. The Ksar housed the central granaries of the various nomadic Berber tribes of the region.

The area was the scene of an unsuccessful German counter-attack by General Erwin Rommel as part of Operation Capri during March 1943 against British Eighth Army forces. The Battle of Medenine was Rommel's last engagement in Africa before he was replaced by General Hans-Jürgen von Arnim as commander of the Afrika Korps.

Climate

In popular culture 

 Part of the town was used as a location for the 1999 US science fiction film Star Wars: Episode I – The Phantom Menace.

See also
Hassi Amor 
Souitir

References

Notes

External links 

 
 Lexicorient

Populated places in Tunisia
Communes of Tunisia
Medenine Governorate